"Hypnotized" is a song by German DJ Purple Disco Machine and British pop band Sophie and the Giants, which was released on 8 April 2020 by Positiva Records. A music video for the song was released in August 2020. An acoustic rendition of the song was released in November 2020.

Charts

Weekly charts

Year-end charts

Certifications

References

2020 singles
2020 songs
Number-one singles in Poland
Positiva Records singles
Purple Disco Machine songs